Dalin Township is an urban township in Chiayi County, Taiwan. To the east is Meishan, to the south Minxiong and to the north Yunlin County. Dalin TzuChi General Hospital (大林慈濟醫院) is located here.

History
The township was formerly down as Dapulin since the Qing empire rule. The first name who came to this area was a Cantonese person. Afterwards, many Chinese immigrated to the area from Guangdong, China and Fujian, China. Most of them worked in the forest. During the Japanese rule, the government set up a sugar factory in the area.

Demographics
It has a population of 29,937 in 11,505 households.

Administrative divisions
The township comprises 21 villages: Damei, Datang, Goubei, Guoxi, Hubei, Jilin, Minghe, Minghua, Neilin, Pailu, Pinglin, Sancun, Sanhe, Sanjiao, Shanglin, Tunglin, Xijie, Xilin, Yihe, Zhongkeng and Zhonglin.

Economy
There are in total about 2,600 hectares of farmland in the township. Agriculture produce in the township are rice, bamboo shoots, oranges, tangerines, pineapples and orchids. The total annual food production is 12,000 tons.

The development of Dapumei industrial area has attracted corporations such as Canon to build factories.

Education
 Nanhua University
 Chung Jen Junior College of Nursing, Health Science and Management
 Chiayi County Tungji high school

Transportation

Taiwan Railways Administration has one station named Dalin Station in the township. The Mianchiuag Taiwan Sugar Railways maintains a "Dalin Station."

Notable natives
 Chester Chou, Deputy Secretary-General of the Legislative Yuan (1999-2014)
 Hsu Nai-lin, TV host, actor, and singer
 Sylvia Chang, actress, writer, singer, producer and director

References

External links

 Dalin Township Office

Townships in Chiayi County